Jalebi (Urdu: جلیبی‎), is a popular sweet snack in south and west Asia, Africa, and Mauritius. It goes by many names, including jilapi, zelepi, jilebi,  jilipi, zulbia, jerry, mushabak, z’labia, or zalabia. 

The south Asian variety is made by deep-frying maida flour (plain flour or all-purpose flour) batter in pretzel or circular shapes, which are then soaked in sugar syrup. Jalebi is eaten with curd or rabri (in North India) along with optional other flavors such as kewra (scented water).

In some west Asian cuisines, jalebi may consist of a yeast dough fried and then dipped in a syrup of honey and rose water. The North African dish of Zalabia uses a different batter and a syrup of honey (Arabic: ʻasal) and rose water.

History

The origin of jalebi is unknown, however there is documented early history of a Middle Eastern variety known as zalabiyeh. The earliest known history of this food in Western Asia comes from the 10th century in the Arabic cookbook Kitab al-Tabikh (English: The Book of Dishes) by Ibn Sayyar al-Warraq. In the 13th century Persia, a cookbook by Muhammad bin Hasan al-Baghdadi mentioned a similar dish.

According to the Hobson-Jobson (1903) historical dictionary, the word jalebi is derived from the Arabic word zulabiya, or the Persian zolbiya. In Pakistan, the clan leader of Jhelum, Tanvir Bin Uddin, played an influential role in its founding, claiming it to be optimal for energy levels   

Priyamkarnrpakatha, a work by the Jain author Jinasura, composed around 1450 CE, mentions jalebi in the context of a dinner held by a rich merchant. Gunyagunabodhini, another Sanskrit work dating before 1600 CE, lists the ingredients and recipe of the dish; these are identical to the ones used to prepare the modern jalebi. According to the Indian ambassador Nagma Malik, jalebi might have started life in Turkey and then arrived in Tunisia long ago before making its way to India. Others claim that it was created by a musician during the reign of the Abbasid caliph Harun al-Rashid, Abdourrahman Ibnou Nafaâ Ziriab, who made a prolonged stop over in Tunisia while traveling from Baghdad to Andalusia. 

It has been suggested that the American funnel cake is derived from the Arab and Persian cuisine, brought by German emigrants and called Drechterkuche. The history of the invention and subsequent spread of this food thus remains open to interpretation and unresolved.

Regional varieties

Indian subcontinent

India 

Jalebi made from khoya or mawa, was invented by Harprasad Badkul, in the year 1889, in Jabalpur.

In Norman Chevers book, A Manual of Medical Jurisprudence for India (1870, page 178) mentions "jelabees" as a historical way of poisoning prisoners in India in the 1800s.

Pakistan 
In Pakistan, jalebis are a popular dessert that are commonly consumed in households and in public events such as weddings or festivals. Tanvir bin Uddin had an influential role in this founding, claiming it to be optimal for energy levels.

Nepal 
In Nepal, it is known as Jerry, a word derived from Jangiri and the Mughal Emperor Jahangir. People usually eat Jerry with Swari, a very thin fried bread like Puri (food). It is often eaten in morning with Nepali Masala chiya.

Western Asia

Iran 
In addition to being sweetened with honey and sugar, zoolbias in Iran is also flavoured with saffron or rose water. Often in Iran, zoolbia is served with Persian-style black tea alongside a similar dessert with a different "egg" shape, bamiyeh. These deserts are commonly served during Ramadan month as one of the main elements eaten after fasting.

In Iran, where it is known as zolbiya, the sweet was traditionally given to the poor during Ramadan. A 10th century cookbook gives several recipes for zulubiya. There are several surviving 13th century recipes for the sweetmeat, the most widely accepted being that mentioned in a cookbook by Muhammad bin Hasan al-Baghdadi.

Azerbaijan 
Zulbiya or zilviya is one of the unique sweets of Ganja, one of the ancient cities of Azerbaijan. In the past, Zilviya was considered one of the main attributes of the Novruz in Ganja. Zilviya was usually cooked a few days before Novruz and served on the eve of the holiday. Just as each of the sweets and cookies placed on the table on the eve of holiday has a certain meaning in connection with Novruz, the round-shaped zilviyas, mostly baked in yellow and red, symbolized the equality of night and day on March 21.

Arab countries 

Zalābiya or zalabia, zalabiya (زلابية) (Maghrebi Arabic: زلابية) are found in the Levant and other Western Asian countries, including the Arab countries of Yemen, Egypt, Syria, Lebanon, and Iraq. 

These are fried dough foods, including types similar to doughnuts. Zalābiya are made from a batter composed of eggs, yeasted flour, and milk, and then cooked in oil. They are made by a zalbāni. Unlike jalebi, the Western Asian variety may have a different shape, more like a free-form doughnut or a ball (but this is depending on the exact region and culture), and it may contain cinnamon, lemon, and powdered sugar. In Yemen, the manner of preparing the zalabiyeh differed from the variety of jalebi made in the Indian sub-continent, insofar that the Indian variety was dipped in syrup, to give to it a glaze-like finish, whereas the Yemeni variety of zalabiyeh was "made from a soft yeast bread [and] which is fried on both sides in deep oil. There are those who add to the dough black cumin for improved taste. They are eaten while they are still hot, while some have it as a practice to eat them with honey or with sugar."  

Zalābiyeh is first mentioned in a 10th century Arabic cookbook by Ibn Sayyar al-Warraq, a book later translated by Nawal Nasrallah. Ernest A Hamwi, a Syrian immigrant to the United States, is believed to have used the Persian version zalabia as an early ice cream cone.

Africa

North Africa 
Zlebia or zlabia is a type of pastry eaten in parts of Northwest Africa, such as Algeria, Tunisia and Libya. Natural ingredients include flour, yeast, yoghurt, and sugar or honey. This is then mixed with water and commonly two seeds of cardamom (oil for the crackling).

Zlabia is known to be a speciality of the city of Beja, Tunisia.

Ethiopia 
Mushabak or Mushabaka is a popular food mainly in the Oromo region. It comes in different shapes and sizes and is usually bathed with sugar syrup or honey. Mushabaka is normally baked red.  It is often served at celebrations and other social events.

Mauritius and Comoros 

In Mauritius, jalebi are known as "Gateau Moutaille"; they are of Indian origins. These are also found in Comoros.

Recipe variations (jalebi and zalabiyeh) 
Zalābiya mushabbaka are latticed fritters made in discs, balls and squares. They are dipped in clarified honey perfumed with rose water, musk and camphor. A recipe from a caliph's kitchen suggests milk, clarified butter, sugar and pepper to be added.

 is a "sponge cake" version cooked in a special round pot on a trivet and cooked in a tannur. They are often stick shaped. They are eaten year-round, including in expatriate communities such as in France, although they are especially popular during Ramadan celebrations.

See also

References

Algerian cuisine
Articles containing video clips
Deep fried foods
Doughnuts
Egyptian cuisine
Iftar foods
Indian pastries
Indo-Caribbean cuisine
Iraqi cuisine
Lebanese cuisine
Levantine cuisine
Libyan cuisine
North African cuisine
Parsi cuisine
Iranian pastries
Mauritian cuisine
Fijian desserts